Southbroom is a coastal village in Ugu District Municipality in the KwaZulu-Natal province of South Africa. It is located 143 km south-west of Durban, and 213 km south of Pietermaritzburg.

The village was officially founded in 1933, and in the 2011 census had a population of 1,615 in 847 households.

History
In 1884, a pioneer named Alfred Eyles established a mission on the site of the present day Outlook Farm. This is the earliest recorded settlement of Southbroom. In 1895, The Fascadale was wrecked on rocks off Southbroom beach while en route to Lisbon, but the timely arrival of another vessel meant that only two people died.

The name "Southbroom" was first associated with the area in 1908, when the Swedish Zulu Mission took over the mission from the Eyles family, who subsequently renamed their home "Southbroom"; a reference to a family home in their native England. Frank and Gilbert Eyles, the youngest sons of Alfred, proclaimed the township in 1933.

In 1935, the Southbroom Hotel opened, with its tidal pool (known as Granny's Pool) opening two years later. The golf course was first opened in 1939, before being extended to a full 18 holes in 1948.

Geography 

Southbroom is located on a gentle hilly topography overlooking the Indian Ocean approximately 23 km south-west of Port Shepstone and 18 km north-east of Port Edward. It is situated between Ramsgate in the north and Marina Beach in the south.

Communities
The Greater Southbroom area includes 5 seaside villages/communities alongside Southbroom proper (the main village) which is located south of Ramsgate and between the Mbizane River to the north and the Kaba River to the south. These communities include:

 Marina Beach which is located south of the Southbroom and the Kaba River and north of San Lameer.
 San Lameer which is located between Marina Beach in the north and Trafalgar in the south.
 Trafalgar which is located south of San Lameer and north of the Mpenjati River and Palm Beach.

Culture and comptemptory life

Beaches 
Southbroom is also home to 5 beaches within its greater area including Southbroom Main Beach, Umkobi Beach on the Kaba river mouth, Marina Beach, San Lameer Beach and Trafalgar Beach. Two of these beaches, Marina Beach and Trafalgar Beach are accredited with the international Blue Flag beach status and have been withholding it for many years.

Golf 
Southbroom has two golf courses within its vicinity, Southbroom Golf Club and San Lameer Country Club.

Southbroom Golf Club is a small 18-hole golf course stretching along the coastline of the village between the smattering of residences making it an integral component of Southbroom and also ranked the most fun golf course in South Africa.

San Lameer Country Club located within the San Lameer Estate, south of Southbroom and Marina Beach is a 18-hole Championship golf course designed by Peter Matkovich and Dale Hayes and is ranked by Compleat Golfer as one of the toughest golf courses in South Africa and is consistently ranked amongst the 30 best golf courses in South Africa by Golf Digest.

Tourism and Hospitality 
Similarly to most seaside communities along the KwaZulu-Natal South Coast, Southbroom mostly depends on tourism for its small-scale economy. Southbroom is most popularly known for the San Lameer Estate, located just south of the village which includes an 18-hole Championship golf course (one of the most popular golf courses on the South Coast), luxury villas, a hotel and spa.

Other than San Lameer, Southbroom includes several hospitality establishments such as B&Bs, guest houses and the Kingfisher Lakeside Resort located in Trafalgar as well as popular restaurants such as the Mariners in Marina Beach.

Infrastructure

Roads 

Southbroom has access to one highway, the R61 highway (future N2 Wild Coast Toll Route). The R61/N2’s intersection with the R620 in Southbroom is the southern terminus for the South Coast Toll Road stretching northwards to Hibberdene and the beginning of the freeway section of the R61/N2.

The R61/N2 runs past Southbroom bypassing the village to the west. The regional route links the village to Ramsgate, Port Shepstone and Durban in the north-east and Port Edward and Mbizana in the south-west.

The R620 (Marine Drive) begins at the intersection with the R61/N2 towards the north of Southbroom and runs along the coast linking Southbroom to the nearby coastal towns of Ramsgate, Margate, Uvongo, Shelly Beach and Port Shepstone in the north-east. The R620 can also be used as an alternative route to Shelly Beach, Port Shepstone, Durban and Kokstad (via the R102 in Port Shepstone) for motorists avoiding the Izotsha Ramp Plaza in Shelly Beach and the Oribi Toll Plaza in Port Shepstone.

References

Populated places in the Ray Nkonyeni Local Municipality
Populated coastal places in South Africa
KwaZulu-Natal South Coast